The 2018–19 season was Cagliari Calcio's third season back in Serie A after being relegated at the end of the 2014–15 season. The club competed in Serie A, finishing 15th, and in the Coppa Italia, where they were eliminated in the round of 16.

The season was coach Rolando Maran's first in charge of the club, following his departure from fellow mid-table side A.C. ChievoVerona.

Players

Squad information

Transfers

In

Loans in

Out

Loans out

Pre-season and friendlies

Competitions

Serie A

League table

Results summary

Results by round

Matches

Coppa Italia

Statistics

Appearances and goals

|-
! colspan=14 style="background:#000080; color:#FF0000; text-align:center| Goalkeepers

|-
! colspan=14 style="background:#000080; color:#FF0000; text-align:center| Defenders

|-
! colspan=14 style="background:#000080; color:#FF0000; text-align:center| Midfielders

|-
! colspan=14 style="background:#000080; color:#FF0000; text-align:center| Forwards

|-
! colspan=14 style="background:#000080; color:#FF0000; text-align:center| Players transferred out during the season

Goalscorers

Last updated: 26 May 2019

Clean sheets

Last updated: 26 May 2019

Disciplinary record

Last updated: 26 May 2019

References

Cagliari Calcio seasons
Cagliari